Askar Orazalinov (born 13 September 1961) is a Kazakhstani water polo player. He competed in the men's tournament at the 2000 Summer Olympics.

References

External links
 

1961 births
Living people
Sportspeople from Almaty
Kazakhstani male water polo players
Olympic water polo players of Kazakhstan
Water polo players at the 2000 Summer Olympics
Asian Games medalists in water polo
Asian Games gold medalists for Kazakhstan
Water polo players at the 1994 Asian Games
Water polo players at the 1998 Asian Games
Water polo players at the 2002 Asian Games
Medalists at the 1994 Asian Games
Medalists at the 1998 Asian Games
Medalists at the 2002 Asian Games
Kazakhstani water polo coaches
Kazakhstan men's national water polo team coaches
Water polo coaches at the 2004 Summer Olympics
20th-century Kazakhstani people
21st-century Kazakhstani people